The first season of Frasier originally aired from September 16, 1993, to May 19, 1994, on NBC, consisting of a total of 24 episodes. This premiere season was mostly directed by James Burrows (15 episodes), alongside Andy Ackerman (6 episodes). The other 2 directors were co-creator David Lee (2 episodes) and Rick Beren (1 episode).

Cast

Main
 Kelsey Grammer as Frasier Crane
 Jane Leeves as Daphne Moon
 David Hyde Pierce as Niles Crane
 Peri Gilpin as Roz Doyle
 John Mahoney as Martin Crane

Special guest
Amanda Donohoe as Catherine
John Glover as Ned Miller
Bebe Neuwirth as Lilith
Mako as Sam Tanaka

Special appearance by
Dr. Joyce Brothers as herself

Recurring
Dan Butler as Bulldog

Guest
Kathleen Noone as Aunt Patrice
Harriet Sansom Harris as Bebe Glazer
Claire Stansfield as Kristina
Patrick Kerr as Noel Shempsky
Edward Hibbert as Gil Chesterton

Episodes

Awards and nominations 

Viewers for Quality Television awards

 1994 Best Quality Comedy Series – Nominated
 1994 Best Lead Actor in a Quality Comedy Series (Kelsey Grammer) – Nominated
 1994 Best Supporting Actor in a Quality Comedy Series (David Hyde Pierce) – WON
 1994 Best Supporting Actress in a Quality Comedy Series (Jane Leeves) – Nominated

Writers Guild awards

 1995 Episodic Comedy ("A Mid-Winter Night's Dream") (Chuck Ranberg & Anne Flett-Giordano) – Nominated

References

1993 American television seasons
1994 American television seasons
Frasier 01